"Fair Katrinelje and Pif-Paf-Poltrie" is a German fairy tale collected by the Brothers Grimm in Grimm's Fairy Tales as tale 131.  A nonsense tale, it was introduced into the first edition as number 45 of the second volume.

It is Aarne-Thompson type 2019, one of a number of chain tales, or cumulative tales.

Synopsis
Pif-Paf-Poltrie asks Fair Katrinelje's father for leave to marry her.  He is told he needs that of "her mother Milk-Cow, her brother High-Pride, her sister Cheese-Love," as well as her own.  Going through the list, he obtains it, on the condition of all the others consenting.  Fair Katrinelje is last; then she lists her dowry:  some pennies, a debt, roots, pretzels, and dried pears—a fine dowry.  She guesses at his occupation, and he declares it is finer than what she guesses until she guesses broommaker.

References

Grimms' Fairy Tales
Literary duos
Works about marriage
ATU 2000-2199